Sekora (Czech feminine: Sekorová) is a surname. Notable people with this surname include:

 Lou Sekora (born 1931), Canadian politician
 Ondřej Sekora (1899–1967), Czech artist and writer

See also
 
 Meanings of minor planet names: 13001–14000#406
 Sýkora
 Sikora

Czech-language surnames